The FIBA Africa Championship 1981 was hosted by Somalia from December 15 to December 23, 1981. Games were played in the national capital Mogadishu. Egypt and Cote d'Ivoire competed in the final. The Cote d'Ivoire squad wound up winning the tournament, its first FIBA Africa Championship, and as a result qualified for the 1982 FIBA World Championship. Somalia and Algeria played for third place, with the Somalia squad emerging victorious.

Competing Nations
The following national teams competed:

Preliminary rounds

Group A

Day 1

Day 2

Day 3

Day 4

Day 5

Group B

Day 1

Day 2

Day 3

Day 4

Day 5

Knockout stage

Classification Stage

Final standings

Cote d'Ivoire qualified for the 1982 FIBA World Championship in Colombia.

External links
 FIBA Archive

B
1981 in African basketball
AfroBasket
B
Basketball in Somalia
December 1981 sports events in Africa